The Tennent Islands are an uninhabited Canadian Arctic island group in the Kitikmeot Region, Nunavut. The islands are located in Rae Strait between the Clarence Islands and Beverly Islands. Boothia Peninsula's Oscar Bay is to the northeast.

The Tennent Islands are low-lying and lake-studded. They, as well as Port Emerson, a two-mile-wide (3.2 km) harbour, were named in honour of Emerson Tennent by Sir John Ross during his second Arctic voyage.

References 

 Arctic Islands at Natural Resources, Atlas of Canada
 

Uninhabited islands of Kitikmeot Region